The Mathematical Society of the Republic of Moldova is  is a non-governmental organisation promoting interests of mathematicians.

Notable people 
 Petru Soltan

References

External links 
 Second Conference of the Mathematical Society of the Republic of Moldova dedicated to the 40 anniversary of the foundation of the Institute of Mathematics and Computer Science of ASM
 Mathematical Society of the Republic of Moldova. An overview over the state of the mathematical activities in the Republic of Moldova
 Societatea Matematică din Republica Moldova

Professional associations based in Moldova
Mathematical societies
Organizations established in 1964
1964 establishments in the Soviet Union